Tinemu-ye Sofla (also Romanized as Tīnemū-ye Soflá, Tīnamu Soflá, Tīnamū-ye Soflá, Tīnemū-e Soflá; also known as Tīnemū-ye Pā’īn) is a village in Dinavar Rural District, Dinavar District, Sahneh County, Kermanshah Province, Iran. At the 2006 census, its population was 165, in 39 families.

References 

Populated places in Sahneh County